In missile guidance, line of sight (LOS) is the line directly between the launcher/tacker and the target, which must be in view. If the target is moving the missile is constantly manoeuvred to be on the line of sight as it changes, this results in the missile flying a curved path to the target (see command to line-of-sight).

The same path is flown as in pursuit guidance but without the missile having a seeker. No ranger data is used in the control and no prediction of intercept location made.

Literature 
 Tactical and Strategic Missile Guidance, Paul Zarchan, American Institute of Aeronautics and Astronautics Inc.

References 

Missile operation
Missile technology
Tracking
Targeting (warfare)